The 1998 California State Treasurer election occurred on November 3, 1998. The primary elections took place on June 3, 1998. The Democratic nominee, Phil Angelides, handily defeated the Republican nominee, State Assemblyman Curt Pringle, for the office previously held by incumbent Matt Fong, who chose not to seek re-election in favor of running for Senate.

Primary results
Final results from Secretary of State of California.

Democratic

Candidates 
Phil Angelides, Former Chairman of the California Democratic Party

Albert Robles

Mervin Evans

Republican

Candidates 
Curt Pringle, Assemblyman and Former Speaker of California State Assembly

Jan Goldsmith

Others

General election results
Final results from the Secretary of State of California.

Results by county
Final results from the Secretary of State of California.

See also
California state elections, 1998
State of California
California State Treasurer

References

1998 California elections
California state treasurer elections
California